McCord is a hamlet in the Canadian province of Saskatchewan.

It is located slightly south of Highway 18, between Ferland and Glentworth, in the south-central portion of the province. McCord has a multi-purpose town hall, a Lucky Dollar grocery store, Dee's Garden Shed, local contractor, a Co-Op with a small farming and hardware section, gas pumps, town museum featuring historical and CPR Railway artifacts, small campground area, two churches, and an arena that previously housed hockey, skating, rodeos and curling.

Etymology
McCord is named after James Samuel (Jim) McCord, an early rancher who homesteaded at N36-5-8-W3.

Demographics 

References

Designated places in Saskatchewan
Mankota No. 45, Saskatchewan
Organized hamlets in Saskatchewan
Division No. 3, Saskatchewan